The Central District of Khondab County is a district (bakhsh) in Khondab County, Markazi Province, Iran. At the 2006 census, its population (including the portions later detached to form Qareh Chay District) was 59,112, in 15,075 families; excluding those portions the population (as of 2006) was 25,692, in 6,229 families.  The District has one city: Khondab.  The District has two rural districts (dehestan): Deh Chal Rural District and Khondab Rural District.

References 

Khondab County
Districts of Markazi Province